The Belgian official journal is the official journal or gazette of the Kingdom of Belgium. It is where the official publication of laws, royal decrees, decrees, ordinances, and official notices are published. The publication is handled by the Federal Public Service Justice.

Content and history
Any new law or changes to it made by the government can only take effect once it has been published in the Staatsblad/Moniteur. Other legal formalities about which the Belgian people need to be informed, including activities such as starting a business, are also published in this paper. Also published are Court mournings after important deaths, and official banquets at Court, with transcripts of speeches.

The journal was established on 16 June 1831. During World War II, the journal was published separately but under the same title by both the Belgian government in exile and the occupying authority. In order to distinguish between the two, the government-in-exile version is retrospectively entitled Belgian Official Journal (Exile Government). To save money, the paper version of the Staatsblad/Moniteur was replaced by an electronic equivalent in 2003, which is available to the public on the Internet. Three copies of every issue are still printed: one for the Royal Library, one for the Senate and one for the House of Representatives.

References

External links 
Official site
justice.belgium.be

Law of Belgium
Government gazettes
1831 establishments in Belgium
Publications established in 1831
Government of Belgium